Alexander Cataford (born 1 September 1993) is a Canadian racing cyclist, who currently rides for UCI WorldTeam . He won the Under-23 title at the 2013 Canadian National Time Trial Championships. He is a six-time Canadian Junior National Champion. In 2011, he was the Junior Pan American Champion in individual pursuit.

For the 2014 season, Cataford joined the  team. In October 2020, he was named in the startlist for the 2020 Giro d'Italia.

Personal life
Cataford was born in Ottawa, Ontario. He attended Queen's University where he graduated with a degree in physics.

Major results

2011
 1st  Time trial, National Junior Road Championships
2013
 National Road Championships
1st  Under-23 time trial
3rd Time trial
2015
 8th Overall Grand Prix Cycliste de Saguenay
 9th Time trial, Pan American Under-23 Road Championships
2016
 2nd Time trial, National Road Championships
 2nd Overall Tour of the Gila
 5th Overall Tour of Alberta
 5th Overall Grand Prix Cycliste de Saguenay
 9th Overall Tour de Beauce
2017
 10th Overall Joe Martin Stage Race
2018
 3rd Time trial, National Road Championships
 3rd Overall Tour of Taihu Lake
 10th Overall Colorado Classic

Grand Tour general classification results timeline

References

External links 

1993 births
Canadian male cyclists
Living people
Sportspeople from Ottawa
Cyclists from Ontario